See also John Stewart (ice hockey, born 1950)

John Christopher Stewart (born January 2, 1954) is a Canadian retired professional ice hockey player. He played 271 games in the World Hockey Association and 2 games in the National Hockey League.

Career 
As a youth, he played in the 1966 Quebec International Pee-Wee Hockey Tournament with the Toronto Red Wings minor ice hockey team During his professional career, Stewart played for the Quebec Nordiques, Birmingham Bulls, and Cleveland Crusaders.

Awards and honours

References

External links

1954 births
Berliner SC players
Binghamton Whalers players
Birmingham Bulls players
Birmingham Bulls (CHL) players
Bowling Green Falcons men's ice hockey players
Canadian ice hockey centres
Cleveland Crusaders draft picks
Cleveland Crusaders players
Living people
Montreal Canadiens draft picks
Philadelphia Firebirds (AHL) players
Quebec Nordiques players
Ice hockey people from Toronto
Syracuse Blazers players
Syracuse Firebirds players